The 28th Dáil was elected at the 1997 general election on 6 June 1997 and met on 26 June 1997. The members of Dáil Éireann, the house of representatives of the Oireachtas (legislature) of Ireland, are known as TDs. The 28th Dáil lasted  days, the 2nd longest after the 10th Dáil. The 28th Dáil was dissolved by President Mary McAleese on 25 April 2002, at the request of the Taoiseach, Bertie Ahern.

Composition of the 28th Dáil

Fianna Fáil and the Progressive Democrats, denoted with bullets, formed the 25th Government of Ireland.

Graphical representation
This is a graphical comparison of party strengths in the 28th Dáil from June 1997. This was not the official seating plan.

Ceann Comhairle
On 26 June 1997, Séamus Pattison (Lab) was proposed by Dick Spring and seconded by Mary O'Rourke for the position of Ceann Comhairle. Pattison was approved without a vote.

List of TDs
This is a list of TDs elected to Dáil Éireann in the 1997 general election, arranged by party. This table is a record of the 1997 general election results. The Changes table below records all changes in membership and party affiliation.

Changes

See also
Members of the 21st Seanad

References

External links
Houses of the Oireachtas: Debates: 28th Dáil

 
28th Dáil
28